Trachemys is a genus of turtles  belonging to the family Emydidae. Members of this genus are native to the Americas, ranging from the Midwestern United States south to northern Argentina, but one subspecies, the red-eared slider (T. scripta elegans), has been introduced worldwide. Species under this genus are commonly referred to as sliders.

Species and subspecies

Extant
Trachemys adiutrix  – Maranhão slider
Trachemys callirostris  – Colombian slider
T. c. callirostris  – Colombian slider
T. c. chichiriviche  – Venezuelan slider
Trachemys decorata  – Hispaniolan slider
Trachemys decussata  – Cuban slider
T. d. angusta  – western Cuban slider
T. d. decussata  – eastern Cuban slider
Trachemys dorbigni  – D'Orbigny's slider
Trachemys emolli  – Nicaraguan slider
Trachemys gaigeae  – Big Bend slider
Trachemys hartwegi  – Nazas slider
Trachemys medemi  – Atrato slider
Trachemys nebulosa  – Baja California slider
T. n. hiltoni  – Fuerte slider
T. n. nebulosa  – Baja California slider
Trachemys ornata  – ornate slider
Trachemys scripta  – pond slider
T. s. elegans  – red-eared slider
T. s. scripta  – yellow-bellied slider
T. s. troostii  – Cumberland slider
Trachemys stejnegeri  – Central Antillean slider
T. s.  malonei  – Inagua slider
T. s.  stejnegeri  – Puerto Rican slider
T. s.  vicina  – Dominican slider
Trachemys taylori  – Cuatro Ciénegas slider
Trachemys terrapen  – Jamaican slider
Trachemys venusta  – Meso-American slider
T. v.  cataspila  – Huasecan slider
T. v.  grayi  – Gray's slider or Tehuantepec slider
T. v.  iversoni  – Yucatan slider
T. v.  panamensis  – Panamanian slider
T. v.  uhrigi  – Uhrig's slider
T. v. venusta  – Belize slider
Trachemys yaquia  – Yaqui slider

Nota bene: In the above list, a binomial authority or a trinomial authority in parentheses indicates that the species or subspecies was originally described in a genus other than Trachemys.

Fossil

† Trachemys inflata  - inflated slider turtle
† Trachemys haugrudi  - Haugrud's slider turtle

References

Further reading
Agassiz L (1857). Contributions to the Natural History of the United States of America. Vol. I. Boston: Little, Brown and Company. li + 452 pp. (Trachemys, new genus, p. 434).

External links
University of Michigan Animal Diversity Web | Genus Trachemys (sliders)

 
Turtle genera
Turtles of North America
Turtles of South America
Taxa named by Louis Agassiz